Anna Vyacheslavivna Kobceva (born 28 October 1986) is a Ukrainian badminton player.

Achievements

BWF International Challenge/Series 
Women's doubles

Mixed doubles

  BWF International Challenge tournament
  BWF International Series tournament
  BWF Future Series tournament

References

External links 
 

Living people
1986 births
Sportspeople from Kharkiv
Ukrainian female badminton players
21st-century Ukrainian women